Don Francisco de Sandoval Acacitzin tlatquic teuctli was the tlatoani (ruler) of the altepetl of Itzcahuacan, Tlalmanalco, Chalco, from 1521 until his death in 1554. Between 1540 and 1542, he fought under the Spanish viceroy Antonio de Mendoza in the Mixtón War and left an account in Nahuatl of his experiences in the war.

Notes

References

External links
Relación de la jornada que hizo don Francisco de Sandoval Acazitli (a translation into Spanish of his account of the Mixtón War)

1554 deaths
Tlatoque
Year of birth unknown